Ravager is an alias used by multiple fictional characters appearing in comic books published by DC Comics. Most appear in series featuring the Teen Titans and have a connection to the villain Slade Wilson / Deathstroke. The name has also been used by the unrelated super-hero team The Ravagers.

The first Ravager was Grant Wilson, the eldest son of Deathstroke. The Ravager alias was subsequently used by an unnamed assassin working for Harvey Dent / Two-Face, Deathstroke's rival Bill Walsh, and Deathstroke's half-brother Wade LaFarge. The most recent and current Ravager is Rose Wilson, Deathstroke's daughter, who is the only heroic character to adopt the alias.

In live action, Ravager debuted as original character Isabel Rochev in the second season of the Arrowverse series Arrow, played by Summer Glau. Grant Wilson also appeared in the first season of Legends of Tomorrow and final season of Arrow played by Jamie Andrew Cutler. Chelsea Zhang portrayed Rose Wilson for her live action debut in the series Titans in the second season.

Fictional character biography

Grant Wilson

The first Ravager is Deathstroke's older son Grant Wilson. While living in New York City, Grant's apartment is wrecked by the sudden arrival of the alien princess Starfire, and the Gordanians following her. Grant blames the Teen Titans for this, and takes a contract from H.I.V.E. to kill them. H.I.V.E. gives Grant a serum that allows him to imitate his father's abilities and enhanced reflexes, but the flawed procedure soon kills Grant, causing Deathstroke to hold the Titans responsible for his death.

Grant was temporarily resurrected by Brother Blood to guard Kid Eternity. In the Teen Titans tie-in to the Blackest Night crossover, Grant Wilson was reanimated as a member of the Black Lantern Corps, attacking his father and half-sister, Rose Wilson.

The New 52
In September 2011, The New 52 rebooted DC's continuity. In this new timeline, Grant's history was changed. He appears to have been beaten and killed in an explosion by Midnighter, but returned after a few years trying to kill his father. Grant surreptitiously manipulates Deathstroke, by allying himself with the fathers of one of Slade's victims and sending a number of villains called Legacy to weaken the mercenary before really facing him. In the aftermath, even having a chance to kill Deathstroke, Grant hesitated and simply walked away. Grant later appeared being mind-controlled by Jericho. He was later killed off by Deathstroke in his attempt to kill Jericho.

DC Rebirth
Grant's backstory is later expanded upon in Deathstroke: Rebirth. In his younger years as a child, he had a strained relationship with his father Slade, who was hard on him, and was distant from his younger brother Joe. His strained family life provokes him to running away as a teenager, unknowingly encountering young members of H.I.V.E who have been spying on his family and took the chance to recruit him. Grant established a relationship with one of the young women and came to join H.I.V.E in his adult life. In the "Lazarus Contract" storyline, Deathstroke tries to revive Grant by stealing Wally West and Wally West II's superspeed to time travel and change the past, but was unsuccessful.

Unknown
The second Ravager was an unnamed hired assassin who worked for the notorious Gotham City criminal Two-Face to eliminate Batman. Ravager lured Batman into a trap by building up his reputation as a dangerous serial killer, but during the confrontation at the top of a dam, Ravager was defeated and he fell to the water below, never to be seen again.

Bill Walsh

The third Ravager is Bill Walsh, a former rival of Deathstroke's who takes up the title to lure Deathstroke into battle. Years before assuming the name Ravager, Walsh was known as the Jackal and was involved in the kidnapping of Slade's younger son, Joseph (who became the hero Jericho), which ultimately resulted in Joseph's throat being slit and his becoming mute. As Ravager, Walsh attempts to kill Slade with a bomb. Slade instead kills Walsh and defuses the bomb.

Wade LaFarge
The fourth Ravager is Slade's half brother, Wade LaFarge, a small-time hitman who uses the name in mockery of Slade. As a child, LaFarge felt resentful of and inferior to Wilson, who often looked out for him. In adulthood, LaFarge would meet a woman named Adeline Kane, become smitten with her, and have a relationship with her for a while. However, his somewhat-abusive tendencies drove her away, and she joined the special forces. Funnily enough, she would meet Slade Wilson there, and the two, unaware of their mutual connection via LaFarge, would fall in love and get married. This drove LaFarge over the edge, and he kidnapped both of Slade and Addie's children, toddlers Grant and Joe, and tried to brainwash them into believing their father was an evil man. Right before he could do any permanent damage to the family, his own mother, Frannie LaFarge, shot him off a cliff. He was presumed dead, but the cold cauterized his wounds and he survived. LaFarge became obsessed with destroying Slade and Addie's relationship so he could win her back for himself, and hired the mercenary known as "The Jackal", another man with a grudge against Slade, to kidnap the Wilson children and force Slade to reveal his double-life as Deathstroke to Addie. After failing to kill Slade and romantically pursue Adeline, Wade was driven deep underground and arrested after a crazed Adeline was presumed dead. Years later, Ravager was offered $100,000 by an anonymous source to perform a hit on Rose Wilson, the daughter of Deathstroke and Lili Worth (an ex of Slade's). He brutally murdered her foster parents, but was interrupted by the Teen Titans, who claimed they had received an anonymous tip. The whole group was knocked out with Halothane gas, and Rose and the Ravager both woke up in Deathstroke's den. Deathstroke made amends with his daughter and offered her the chance to rekindle their relationship and also turn the Ravager legacy into something good again. He took her on as his apprentice, and let her first kill the man who murdered her mother. Rose Wilson killed LaFarge with Deathstroke's sword, and would go on to become the fourth Ravager. Wade's name in this issue is mistakenly listed as Wade DeFarge.

In the Teen Titans tie-in to the Blackest Night crossover, Wade LaFarge was reanimated as a member of the Black Lantern Corps, attacking Rose and Slade. He fought Rose, who attempted to incinerate him, but then found out that Rose was possessed by her brother Jericho.

Rose Wilson

The fifth Ravager is Rose Wilson, Slade's illegitimate daughter. At one period, Deathstroke manipulates and brainwashes her into becoming his apprentice. After a brief stint training with Nightwing in an attempt to make the Secret Society of Super Villains leave Blüdhaven alone, Rose realizes that Deathstroke does not have her best interests at heart and leaves him. One year after the events of Infinite Crisis, she has joined the Teen Titans, as seen in Teen Titans (vol. 3) #34 (May 2006).

The Ravagers

The Ravagers (rather than Ravager) also exist as the name of a team in DC comics. In September 2011, The New 52 rebooted DC's continuity. In this new timeline, the Ravagers are introduced as a group of super-powered teens who have escaped the plans of Harvest in the Culling. The Ravagers title first appeared as part of The New 52's Second Wave in 2012. The team was formed after the Teen Titans and the Legionnaires stuck in the present day were abducted by Harvest, and then later stopped the villain and escaped.
The team includes Beast Boy, Terra, Thunder and Lightning, Ridge and Fairchild.

Other versions

Titans Tomorrow
In the "Titans Tomorrow" storyline, the Teen Titans are thrown back in time after teaming up with the Legion of Super-Heroes, only to arrive ten years into their own future. They discover that as adults, they are evil authoritarian dictators. However, a Titans East team has been formed to stop them. Rose Wilson is a member of the Titans East and is in love with Bart Allen, then the Flash, who is spying on the evil Titans. Rose and the Flash help the Teen Titans to return home.

The concept is revisited in Teen Titans vol. 3, where it revealed that the future has changed somewhat. Future Bart Allen is now just as unscrupulous as his teammates, and Rose's counterpart is dead. There exists no Titans East/Titans West division, as all belong to a greatly expanded teammates Titans Army.

Tiny Titans
Rose appears in Tiny Titans, although she does not go by Ravager. She wears an eye patch on her right eye and had an undamaged eye underneath. It is not mentioned whether the patch was worn to improve her sight.

Flashpoint
In the alternate timeline of the Flashpoint event, Rose Wilson was kidnapped by persons unknown, where her father Deathstroke, a pirate, is searching for her. Deathstroke and his shipmate Jenny Blitz located Rose, who was being held captive on the Caretaker's fleet. Deathstroke formulated a plan, while he and Jenny battled Caretaker's crew and manages to save Rose. After battling Caretaker's fleet, Rose rescued Deathstroke and Jenny from drowning, and is then reunited with her father and sailing towards an unknown destination.

DC Bombshells
Ravager appears in the DC Bombshells continuity as a member of the Coven along with Barbara Gordon and the Enchantress. This version is a prophetic pirate and uses her abilities to predict the moves of her opponents and to warn her comrades not to stray from the Belle Reeve Manor. While Killer Croc is specific on why Batgirl and Enchantress are at the bayou Manor, he just claims that Ravager "did something bad". After Francine Charles proves Ravager's prophecy on never leaving Belle Reeve to be false, the Coven, Charles, and Killer Croc, form Amanda Waller's Suicide Squad.

In other media

Television

Animation
 The Rose Wilson version of Ravager appears in Teen Titans Go!, voiced by Pamela Adlon. In the episode "Cool School", she was originally detained at the Jump City Juvenile Correction Facility where she breaks out of confinement and runs into the Teen Titans. She easily defeats them using insults that touched upon their sensitive areas, except for Raven, whom she befriends after discovering their mutual aptitude at witty, sarcastic humor. The two then hang out together, much to the other Titans' chagrin. Eventually Rose thinks of harming a civilian, which Raven doesn't allow, causing a fight between them. Rose overpowers Raven and is about to finish her off when the other Titans come to her rescue. When the Titans figure out that Rose's own weakness is earnest affection, they begin to reaffirm their friendship, which sickens Rose into defeat. She later appears in "Operation Dude Rescue", where she teams up with Starfire, Raven, Jinx, and Terra to save Robin, Beast Boy, and Cyborg from The Brain. At first, Rose refuses to join them, but is then convinced to join them and tells Raven that she missed her, repairing their friendship. She also makes cameo appearances in "Black Friday", "Bottle Episode", and "The Titans Show", the latter where she fights the Titans alongside the villains in the highlight of Control Freak's Island Adventures reality show.
 The Rose Wilson version of Ravager appears in DC Super Hero Girls. She appears as a Super Hero High student and has a non-speaking cameo.
 The Jackal appears in Deathstroke: Knights & Dragons, voiced by Chris Jai Alex. In this series, he is an armored mercenary alongside the Bronze Tiger aiding H.I.V.E. to recruit Slade Wilson. In a decade before the present setting, he attacks and breaks Adeline Wilson's leg and kidnaps Joseph hoping to force him to work with him. He is later stabbed as Deathstroke leaves him and Tiger for dead, but not before Jackal ordered a soldier to slash Joseph's throat. In the present, Jackal has adopted Rose Wilson, transforming her into the H.I.V.E. Queen and his discipline along with a transformed Jericho/Joseph with plans of world domination. He is then killed when the Wilson children betray him and died in an explosion.

Live action
 Versions of Ravager appear in the projects set in the Arrowverse:
 Summer Glau portrays Isabel Rochev on Arrow. Her backstory is revealed in the novel Arrow: Vengeance. Orphaned as a child by the Bratva, Rochev was adopted by an American couple and moved to the United States. Gaining an internship at Queen Consolidated, she had an affair with CEO Robert Queen, but was eventually abandoned by him. In the second season of the show, Rochev appears initially as Oliver Queen's new 50/50 partner at Queen Consolidated. Eventually it is revealed that she was secretly trained by Slade Wilson / Deathstroke with the intention of taking over the company as revenge for what Oliver's father did to her. After being mortally wounded by John Diggle, Wilson saves Rochev with a blood transfusion, infecting her with the Mirakuru serum in the process. She dons a mask and takes on the moniker Ravager as part of Deathstroke's army. When Deathstroke unleashes his army on Starling City, Rochev takes part in the attack, most notably killing mayor Sebastian Blood for betraying Wilson. In the season finale, Rochev is captured by the vigilantes protecting Starling City. Proving uncooperative and boasting about Deathstroke killing Oliver's mother, Rochev has her neck snapped by Nyssa al Ghul.
 Jamie Andrew Cutler portrayed the Earth-16 Grant Wilson in Legends of Tomorrow episode "Star City 2046". This version takes up the name Deathstroke in tribute to his father, and starts an uprising that drives Star City to ruin. He has defeated the aging Oliver Queen and sliced off his arm. Grant is later defeated by Earth-16 Oliver, Earth-16 John Diggle, Jr., and the time-travelling Legends. 
 Grant's name was mentioned in the Arrow episode "Promises Kept", where his brother Joe reveals his existence to their father Slade, who then goes on to find his two sons. Grant Wilson's future counterpart appears in the episode "Present Tense" portrayed again by Jamie Andrew Cutler. He becomes the latest Deathstroke and leads an earlier version of the Deathstroke Gang to follow in his father's footsteps. At the time when they were brought to the present, Mia Smoak, Connor Hawke, and William Clayton at first mistook him for a time-displaced John Diggle Jr. when they arrive at where the Deathstroke Gang had their hideout in 2040. After Green Arrow rescues them from a motion-activated bomb trap, William and Connor came clean about the bad parts of 2040 which included Grant Wilson training John Diggle Jr. to be his apprentice as well as Zoe Ramirez's death which left John Diggle and Rene Ramirez devastated. When it came to the Deathstroke Gang's planned attack, Team Arrow and Future Team Arrow took the battle to three different fronts. When Grant is defeated, Mia is talked out of killing him by Green Arrow. It was mentioned by Dinah Drake that Grant was arrested and remanded to Blackgate Penitentiary.
 Chelsea Zhang portrays Rose Wilson in DC Universe's Titans making her debut in the second season. In the episode "Rose", Rose is on the run from her father Slade Wilson / Deathstroke. While on the run, she is found by Dick Grayson who witnessed her fighting skills through a TV news report, prompting Dick to recruit her to the Titans, but Rose keeps denying his offer for protection. Later by the end of the episode, Doctor Light attacks Dick and Rose. After her induction into the team, she begins a relationship with Jason Todd, the second Robin. In the episode "Faux Hawk", it's revealed in a flashback that Rose was brought in by Wintergreen against Slade's wishes and displays healing powers, wishing to be a part of the family. Slade begins training her for a covert mission to infiltrate the Titans as revenge for the death of Jericho.

Film
 An alternate version of Rose Wilson makes her animated debut in Justice League: Crisis on Two Earths, voiced by Freddi Rogers. Here, she has red hair instead of white (likely due to the parallel Earth). She is the daughter of Slade Wilson, the President of the United States on the parallel Earth of the Crime Syndicate and uses her notoriety to publicly denounce the Syndicate and her father's policy of appeasement (it is heavily implied  that Ultraman personally killed Rose's mother). Later on, J'onn J'onzz saves her from an assassination attempt by Archer and volunteers to be her personal bodyguard. The two quickly fall in love. Once the Syndicate is defeated, they part ways. When Wonder Woman suggests him to seek out Rose's mainstream counterpart, J'onn speculates "With my luck, she'll be evil".

Miscellaneous
 While Rose never appeared in the Teen Titans animated series, she appeared as the antagonist in an issue of the tie-in comic, Teen Titans Go! issue #49. As Ravager, she returns to Jump City, hoping to claim "what is rightfully hers". Ravager finds and attacks Wintergreen and Professor Chang, both of whom had something which belonged to her father. After blowing up Chang's robot factory, she goes on a rampage in Jump City, determined to carry on her father's legacy by defeating the Teen Titans once and for all. After a duel with Robin, the Titans help her understand that she does not have to carry on her father's legacy and offer her a home and a family while convincing her that she is free to make her own decisions in life. Touched by the Titans' words of friendship, she decides to frequently train (but not officially join) with them until she is ready to face her future as a better person.
 Rose Wilson appears as Ravager in Smallville Season 11. She attempts to continue her father's work (Slade in this continuity having been a general with an obsession with stopping superpowered vigilantes, until he was left catatonic after Clark put him into the Phantom Zone), by taking out 'the next generation' of superheroes. Her Ravager gear seems to be heavily modeled after what Deathstroke wore in the second season of Arrow.
 In the tie-in novel "Arrow: Vengeance", which details the backstory of Deathstroke in the Arrow show, it is revealed that Wade DeForge was Slade's commanding officer in the government, and half brother to the late Billy Wintergreen. DeForge had sent Slade and Wintergreen on the fateful mission that resulted in them going to Lian Yu, Billy betraying Slade, Slade being forced to kill Wintergreen, and get injected with the Mirakuru. Later, when Slade returns from the island, he abuses government resources to learn about Oliver Queen, with whom he is obsessed with due to the Mirakuru affecting his mind. DeForge discovers this, along with Slade's killing of Wintergreen, and confronts him in his home just as Slade finds out Oliver is alive and well, causing Slade to lose control and kill DeForge, along with his wife Adeline and son Joseph. The novel is non-canon in some elements, like in the season 5 finale where Oliver gives Slade information on Joe including his current location. Slade's son Joe appeared in the sixth season as a young man and a villain, while his mother is alive. He also has a brother named Grant whom says that he killed him, believing that his mother disowned him, but Slade is suspicious about this and goes on quest to find his sons.

Video games
 In Injustice: Gods Among Us, Grant Wilson's name is listed on a hit list during Deathstroke's outro. Also, Rose Wilson appears as Ravager as a non-playable helper card in the mobile version of that game.
 In DC Universe Online, Grant is mentioned as Deathstroke's son having been killed by the Titans. When the Titans encounter Deathstroke, he mentions to get revenge for his son. Adeline and Jericho reunite with him by possessing Deathstroke's body to defeat Terra. Rose Wilson appears as Ravager as well.
 The Teen Titans Go! incarnation of Rose Wilson appears as a non-playable character in Lego Dimensions with Pamela Adlon reprising the role. She appears in a sidequest where the player helps her escape from the Jump City Juvenile Detention Facility.
 The Rose Wilson incarnation of Ravager appears as a playable character in Lego DC Super-Villains.

References

Fictional super soldiers
Comics characters introduced in 1984
Characters created by Marv Wolfman
Comics characters introduced in 1980
Comics characters introduced in 1989
Comics characters introduced in 1994
DC Comics martial artists
DC Comics superheroes
DC Comics supervillains
Fictional assassins in comics
Characters created by George Pérez
DC Comics code names